Sir Robert Bacon, 3rd Baronet of Redgrave (1574–1655) was an English politician.

Life
He was born on 4 May 1574 at Redgrave Manor, Suffolk, the fifth son of Sir Nicholas Bacon, 1st Baronet and his wife Anne Butts, daughter of Edmund Butts. He spent most of his life residing in Riborough in Norfolk.

In 1649, Robert Bacon succeeded his older brother Edmund as baronet. Bacon was buried at Ryburgh in Norfolk

Robert Bacon died on 16 December 1655, at Ryburgh, Norfolk. He was succeeded in the baronetcy by Edmund, a son of his seventh son.

Family 
Bacon was married twice. He had nine sons and three daughters by his first wife, Anne Peyton, daughter of Sir John Peyton, 1st Baronet, of Cambridge. Among his sons were Nathaniel, Edmund, Henry, Francis, and Drury, all of whom died young. The other sons were Nicholas, Hobart, and Robert. Nicholas married Margaret, and Robert married Catherine.

References

1655 deaths
1574 births
Baronets in the Baronetage of England
Members of the Parliament of England for St Ives
Robert
English MPs 1621–1622